RPG Maker 2000 (RM2K) is the second Microsoft Windows version of the RPG Maker series of programs developed by Enterbrain and published by ASCII.

RPG Maker 2000 was originally released as RPG Tsukūru 2000 (RPGツクール2000) in April 2000 in Japan. Outside Japan, it initially had only received weak distributions among Taiwanese and South Korean markets, and was mostly distributed on the Internet as unauthorized translations into various languages. On July 7, 2015, the Humble Game Maker Bundle went live, including RM2K, which is where it was first officially released in English. It was also made available for purchase on Steam.

Etymology
It is named after Windows 2000.

Features
Compared to RPG Maker 95, RM2K features lower-resolution graphics than RM95, using a 320x240 resolution instead of 640x480, and using 16x16 tiles instead of 32x32 tiles, but has other visual improvements such as a higher frame rate, weather effects and panorama backgrounds. It also includes an extra layer for tiles, jumping characters, additional functions and customizable message and menu boxes.

RPG Maker 2000 uses a 320 x 240 screen resolution for playing games, and has 16x16 pixel tiles, with 24x32 character sprites. Its default green message-window and menu systems are one of the first signs that a particular game was made with RPG Maker 2000, although it can be customized. Some may view these low-res graphics as a limitation, but they could also be viewed as an advantage, because the low-res graphics are not only more compatible with older computers, but sometimes they can be much easier to draw.

RPG Maker 2000 uses a Dragon Quest-like battle system which features a classical turn-based, "front-view" battle system, where the enemy faces you directly on the screen and you do not see your characters on screen. With some tweaking, the battle system can be made to look somewhat like a "side-view" battle system.

The music featured in RPG Maker 2000 consists of a large collection of MIDI and, less commonly, WAV files. An update to version 1.50 at the release of VALUE! (see below) added the possibility to use WAV files compressed with ADPCM (also usable for sound effects) as well as support for the MP3 format. At the same day, these features were added to the successor RPG Maker 2003 (ver. 1.05). Through the use of unofficial patches released afterwards, MP3 files can also be used in older versions, though reliability with said patch has always been an issue. In some RPG Maker communities, it is still a common misbelief that RPG Maker 2003 was the only version to support MP3 files natively before RPG Maker XP's release because newer versions of RPG Maker 2000 were unknown to most users outside Japan.

RPG Maker 2000 was the first in the series that introduced the "Runtime Package", also known as "RTP", which was also adopted by the later PC versions. The RTP is a whole set of default graphics, music, and sound effects that are used in RPG Maker 2000 and, in most cases, the RTP must be downloaded to the computer to play the games made with RPG Maker 2000. Thanks to the RTP, created games can lessen their file size if a lot of material from the RTP was used.

Bonus contents
The Japanese version of RPG Maker 2000 included the following demos:
, by Shin Araki et al.
Abyss-Diver #0, by Kenji Shigetoshi
, by Amanda Dyar
, by Shinji Fukuda
III, by Makoto Yaotani
, by Yuunya
, by Yuwaka

These were not appended to Don Miguel's English translation version, while Don Miguel incorporated his original sample game instead. Materials included in those games are free to use, and often utilized for actual RPG making.

RPG Maker 2000 VALUE!

This version includes the following changes to RPG Maker 2000:
Event
Event command 'text display' supports using player's name as variable via \N parameter, and the variable number can be replaced via \V parameter.
The number of pictures can be displayed simultaneously is increased from 20 to 50.
The display priority of combat animation is changed to above picture.
In event command 'key entry processing (キー入力の処理), the direction keys up, down, left, right can be changed separately.
Combat
Enemy character's HP displays is set to 5 columns width.
Default message display speed is faster.
The number of steps in random encounter is less varied.
If the damage becomes 0 because the effect variation rate is 0%, the actual damage value is changed from 1 at random times to always be 0.
Battle events 'display selection branch' (選択肢の表示) and 'process value entry' (数値入力の処理) are added.
Audio
New supported playback formats include MP3, and WAV (Microsoft ADPCM codec). MP3 can be used as background music.
Others
Minimum supported operating system is changed to Windows 98.
32 new sample games

RPG Maker 2000 VALUE!+

This version includes following:
RPG Maker 2000 VALUE!+ 1.52
A new help file that works on Windows Vista and newer
RPG Maker 2000 handbook (RPGツクール2000ハンドブック) graphics pack
Online product registration
Minimum supported operating system is changed to Windows XP

See also
Super Columbine Massacre RPG!

References

External links

ASCII Corp pages: RM2000
Enterbrain pages: 2000, 2000 VALUE!, 2000 VALUE!+
Enterbrain support pages: Japanese

Video game IDE
2000